Paul Ceesay is a Gambian Olympic middle-distance runner. He represented his country in the men's 1500 meters at the 1984 Summer Olympics. His time was a 3:59.14 in the first heat. He is the twin brother of fellow athlete Peter Ceesay.

References

1959 births
Living people
Gambian male middle-distance runners
Olympic athletes of the Gambia
Athletes (track and field) at the 1984 Summer Olympics